A show choir (originally known as a "swing choir") is a musical ensemble that combines choral singing with choreographed dance, often with an overarching theme. It is most relevant in the Midwestern United States and was popularized by the American television show Glee.

Location

Show choir is a type of performing arts that is primarily a secondary school activity in the United States. It is typically a co-curricular activity (part of a class or connected to the academic curriculum) or an extracurricular activity. Alternate examples include organizations formed outside of a school, such as community choirs that make use of students from multiple schools in the surrounding area. Though usually a high school activity, show choir exists at all levels of school from elementary through the collegiate level.

Outside of the United States, show choirs can be found in countries such as Canada, Mexico, United Kingdom, Ireland, Philippines, and Argentina.

Overview
While there is no standard requirement for the number of performers or demographic of its students, a show choir typically consists of 30 to 60 singer/dancers. Factors like school size or director preferences may impact this number. Larger schools with more advanced programs may have more than one competitive show choir ensemble. Show choirs composed entirely of students of one gender usually compete in separate divisions from mixed-gender show choirs, with the exception of "open" divisions, where groups of different types compete against each other.

Show choir performers traditionally wear a costume, though the definition of what is considered a costume in this context is broad and ranges from jeans and a T-shirt to extravagant period costumes or flashy dancewear. Costumes can be conservative (such as formal tuxedos and ball gowns) or edgy (such as modern head-to-toe uniforms or revealing clothing). Additionally, many larger groups include two or more costumes in their show. Singer/dancers typically wear stage makeup and shoes conducive to dancing (called "character shoes"). Uniformity in look among performers is also common; generally, there is consistency in costuming and makeup from person to person. In most regions, this consistency even extends to things like hair, where female participants will all style their hair in a visually consistent way.

The choir usually has a backup band ("pit" or "combo" if it includes a horn section) providing instrumental music to complement the singers' voices. Instrumentation selection often varies between choirs and even from one group's song selection to another, but a common show choir band consists of trumpets, trombone, alto/soprano sax, tenor sax, piano, and synthesizer, guitar, bass, auxiliary percussion, and a drumset. Some bands even include violins or cellos if the piece requires it. The size of the pit ensemble may vary greatly, but as a common rule of thumb, larger show choirs typically have larger bands to accompany them (anywhere from 3 musicians upwards of 30 in bigger schools). The band is usually not visually featured, but, occasionally, a show will bring out members of the band onstage to accentuate thematic elements in the show.

A "tech crew" or "stage crew" is also standard with most show choirs. They handle things like lighting, sound, and the stage setup. During a show, the crew may have a great number of responsibilities, including helping performers change costumes, managing props, handing out microphones, running special effects, and other duties set out in the design of the show.

Due to a stigma that the performing arts is a more feminine activity, many teenage boys are not attracted to participating in show choir. However, in order to achieve a full choral sound with rich melodies and tonal variety, show choirs need males to cover all vocal ranges. One study done by the Choral Journal  claimed that many choir directors are simply resigned to having fewer males in their choir, but should make an effort to change. By reaching out to males and creating a more supportive community for high school boys, the hope is that more males will participate in show choir. With a higher number of males in the activity, a department can expect to see better scores at competition and higher team morale.

Competitions

Many show choirs participate in competitions, sometimes called "invitationals" (though most are not invitation-only events) or "festivals". These competitions are often held at the high school where the "host group" attends and sometimes performs as an exhibition, though some events are held at auditoriums or other facilities that can accommodate larger crowds and provide better acoustic performance. 

Competitions can be as small as a showcase of a few groups from the immediate geographic area or they can feature many groups from multiple states.  Because of the vast difference in sizes of the competitions, they can last a single afternoon or span an entire weekend. Competitions may separate competing choirs into different divisions. These divisions are often determined by age, skill level, size of the school or choir, and/or gender of the participants.  The different divisions may take place at a different time, day, or at a different location or venue, though usually within the same school or close geographic area.

Show choir shows or "sets" can be presented in a multitude of ways, from a more traditional approach to modern theatrical performances that tell full-length stories. These performances are often created by the choir's director, but can stem from the imagination of a group's choreographer or even outside performing arts professionals as well. As show choir has evolved, an increasing number of schools have invested a great deal of effort in creating quality sets that can be compared to professional stage shows.

Many competitions include a preliminary round and a finals round. The finals round commences after awards from the preliminary round are complete, where the top scoring groups perform again in order to compete for the title of Grand Champion of the contest. The number of groups in the finals round is up to the hosting school, but typically 5-6 choirs participate. These groups are sometimes given the opportunity to take suggestions, either from scoring judges or separate experts called in to give critiques made during the preliminary round, and make adjustments to their finals performance in order to earn a better score. Hosting schools do not compete in the competition for ethical purposes.

The adjudicators (or judges) at most competitions are often experts in the show choir field. They may be directors from other choirs, choreographers, arrangers, or performers from Broadway-style musicals. Judging is largely subjective and is based on a scoring style selected by the hosts.  Some competitions place more emphasis on choral aspects, while others incorporate a greater emphasis on the entire show (including choreography, the band, and/or show design). Depending on the competition, each judge may judge only in their area of expertise (a choir director judging vocals, while a choreographer judging dance), or they may adjudicate all areas of the score sheet. Additionally, a separate judge may be added to the panel to judge the bands, and/or to select outstanding performers for separate awards.

At many competitions, there are also individual, or solo, competitions which take place. They take place during the main competition in a different area than the show choir performances. Winners are announced, and they may perform at the start of the finals performance.

Characteristics of a performance

Most show choir shows consist of a variety of musical selections, often including several choreographed, fast-paced pieces and one slower piece performed with limited or no choreography.  This slower number—usually a ballad—exists primarily to showcase the ensemble's singing ability.  In California, it is a requirement that at least one minute of any one set be sung a cappella (it is usually one full song in the set), though this is not a standard in the rest of the country.  More often than not, the a cappella selection is also the ballad, as it is much easier to sing unaccompanied while holding relatively still. In the Midwest, it is becoming popular to set one song aside as a "novelty" piece, designed to make the audience laugh.  "Concept" or "story" shows that unify all of the songs together in a common theme are becoming popular across the country.

Within a song, vocal lines typically alternate between unison or octave singing, and two-or-more-part polyphonic harmony.  Songs are chosen, adapted, and arranged from a variety of sources including popular music, jazz standards, and Broadway musicals, but rarely make use of classical music.  Original music has also been performed by a small number of groups.  Additionally, there is often at least one solo in each performance by a standout singer in the group.

Competitive performance sets range in length, but are usually timed to total between fifteen and twenty-five minutes. Shows generally consist of, but are not limited to, approximately five songs.

Popularity

Show choirs have seen a rise in popularity since the American television series, "Glee" was released. The television show is based around the workings of a fictional show choir. Some individuals feel the television show does not accurately represent the environment of a real show choir.

Commitment
For many high school students, show choir is a large commitment that takes over a large part of a school year.  For some, show choir is part of the school curriculum and is a class taught during the day.  For others, it is an extracurricular activity that requires practice to take place before or after school.  Practices may begin as early as the summer, while other choirs don’t start until much later. The competitive season takes place from January until April, with competitions held across the country every weekend during that time.

References

External links

Choirs
Performing arts